Mull is a 1988 Australian drama film directed by Don McLennan. The film is based on the popular 1986 book, Mullaway by Bronwen 'Bron' Nichols.

Plot
A sixteen-year-old teenage girl (Nadine Garner) is forced to care for her family, when her mother (Sue Jones) finds out she is dying of Hodgkin’s disease. The family consists of her father (Bill Hunter) a reformed alcoholic and recently born-again Christian, her heroin-dabbling closet gay older brother (Craig Morrison), and two trying younger siblings (Bradley Kilpatrick and Kymara Stowers) all packed into a rented flat in the Melbourne bayside suburb of St Kilda. She also has to deal with her pregnant Greek best friend (Mary Coustas), her yearnings for her brother’s lover (Juno Roxas) and her gay former schoolteacher plus his lover.

Cast

Production
The film's budget was $3 million but McLennan says only $1.7 million went on the film, the rest went into fees.

Awards
Mull received six nominations at the 1988 Australian Film Institute Awards: 'Best Film', 'Best Director' (McLennan), 'Best Actress' (Garner), 'Best Supporting Actress' (for both Jones and Coustas) and 'Best Costume Design' (Jeanie Cameron). Nadine Garner winning the 'Best Actress' award.

The film was also screened at the 33rd Regus London Film Festival in 1989.

References

External links

Mullaway at Oz Movies

1989 films
1989 drama films
Australian LGBT-related films
Australian drama films
1980s English-language films
Films directed by Don McLennan
1980s Australian films
LGBT-related drama films